The pilot episode of the British programme Time Team has never been aired. It was produced in 1992, and copies of the pilot have since been lost. Only one clip of the pilot is known to exist.

Episode

Pilot

Episode # refer to the number in air date order which includes the specials episode which broadcast in between regular episodes
{| class="wikitable plainrowheaders" style="width:100%; margin:auto;"
|-
! width="8%" | Episode #
! width="8%" | Series #
! width="25%" | Episode Title
! width="18%" | Location
! width="18%" | Coordinates
! width="13%" | Original airdate

|}

See also
 Time Team Live
 Time Team History Hunters
 Time Team Digs
 Time Team Extra
 Time Team America
 Time Team Specials
 Time Team Others

References

External links
Time Team at Channel4.com
The Unofficial Time Team site Fan site

Time Team